Harry Moy (1911–1994) was a boxer who competed for England.

Moy won a bronze medal in the lightweight division at the 1934 British Empire Games in London.

Personal life
He lived in Camberwell.

References

1911 births
1994 deaths
English male boxers
Commonwealth Games bronze medallists for England
Commonwealth Games medallists in boxing
Boxers at the 1934 British Empire Games
Lightweight boxers
Medallists at the 1934 British Empire Games